Reading Athletic Club, based in Reading, Berkshire, is one of the oldest and longest established athletic clubs in the United Kingdom. They officially formed in November 1881, however records show that they were one of the inaugural clubs that formed the governing body of athletics at that time, the Amateur Athletic Association (AAA) in 1880.

Reading Athletic Club has had a long and distinguished history in the world of athletics and have produced notable national and world champions, including Britain's first female gold medalist over 800m, Ann Packer. Britain's fastest ever female sprinter - Kathy Smallwood-Cook, as well as household names such as Gerry Stevens and Nigel Spratley.

References

External links 
 

Athletics clubs in England
Sports clubs established in 1881
Sport in Reading, Berkshire
1881 establishments in England